Pavlich is an anglicized version of the Croatian surname Pavlić. Notable people with the surname include:

 Katie Pavlich (born 1988), American journalist
 Matthew Pavlich (born 1981), Australian footballer
 Michael Pavlich, Australian broadcaster

Croatian surnames